Abderaz (also Romanized as Ābderāz and Āb Darāz) is a village in Golbibi Rural District, Marzdaran District, Sarakhs County, Razavi Khorasan Province, Iran. At the 2006 census, its population was 552, in 132 families.

See also 

 List of cities, towns and villages in Razavi Khorasan Province

References 

Populated places in Sarakhs County